The men's 470 class at the 2014 ISAF Sailing World Championships was held in Santander, Spain 14–20 September.

Results

References

Men's 470
470 World Championships